The Rhode Island Tiger Sharks were a former Northeast League minor-league baseball team, located in West Warwick, Rhode Island.  The Northeast League was an independent league and as such none of the teams in it were affiliated with Major League Baseball teams.  The team played its home games at McCarthy Field and existed just one season, 1996.

The Northeast League hosted its first season in 1995 and played as a six-team league, with all teams being based in the state of New York.  The league immediately looked to expand and also three of the original six teams did not make it to a second year.  The Northeast League wanted to expand into the New England Region and had to search fast.  West Warwick would be one of the New England cities granted a franchise, taking over for the Mohawk Valley Landsharks.  Bangor, Maine was granted the other.  

The home field for the Tiger Sharks was McCarthy Field. The stadium proved not to be very conducive to minor-league baseball play. Although many home runs were hit that season, very few were by the Tiger Sharks. The team finished dead-last in the six-team league, with a record of 19–61, a full 36 games behind the first place Albany-Colonie Diamond Dogs and 11 games behind second to last place Adirondack. The team finished dead last in the league in runs per game with just 4.03 runs per game, and also sported a league-worst ERA of 6.37. They only hit 37 home runs while giving up 92. The only recognizable player for the Tiger Sharks was former New York Yankees utility outfielder Mike Humphreys.

It did not take long to figure out that minor-league baseball was not suited for the city and the park.  Only about 200 fans attended per game and after the 1996 season the decision was made to shut down the team.  The Tiger Sharks became the Allentown Ambassadors.

References

Northern League (baseball, 1993–2010) teams
Professional baseball teams in Rhode Island
Defunct independent baseball league teams
1996 establishments in Rhode Island
1996 disestablishments in Rhode Island
Defunct baseball teams in Rhode Island
Baseball teams disestablished in 1996
Baseball teams established in 1996